Votkinsky District (Votka joros) is an administrative and municipal district (raion), one of the twenty-five in the Udmurt Republic, Russia. It is located in the east of the republic. Its administrative center is the town of Votkinsk (which is not administratively a part of the district). Population:  23,709 (2002 Census);

Geography
The main river in the district is the Kama, which defines the district's eastern and southeastern borders. Other important rivers include the Votka and the Siva.

Administrative and municipal status
Within the framework of administrative divisions, Votkinsky District is one of the twenty-five in the republic. The town of Votkinsk serves as its administrative center, despite being incorporated separately as a town of republic significance—an administrative unit with the status equal to that of the districts.

As a municipal division, the district is incorporated as Votkinsky Municipal District. The town of republic significance of Votkinsk is incorporated separately from the district as Votkinsk Urban Okrug.

Demographics
Ethnic composition (according to the 2002 Census):
Russians: 71%
Udmurt people: 22.4%
Tatars: 1.95%

References

Notes

Sources

Districts of Udmurtia